Annadammula Savaal is a 1978 Indian Telugu-language drama film directed by K. S. R. Das. The film starring Krishna, Rajinikanth, Jayachitra and Chandrakala. Anjali Devi, Chalam, Jayamalini and Allu Ramalingaiah in the supporting cast. It is a remake of the 1977 Kannada film Sahodarara Savaal.

Plot 

It is a story which deals with a clash between two brothers, played by Krishna and Rajinikanth, and how they unite in the end.

Cast 
 Krishna
 Rajinikanth
 Anjali Devi
 Jayachitra
 Chandrakala
 Jayamalini
 Chalam
 Allu Ramalingaiah
 Halam

Soundtrack 
Soundtrack was composed by Satyam. He reused the tune of Ninagaagiye  from the original as Naa Kosame.

References

External links 
 

1970s Telugu-language films
1978 films
Films directed by K. S. R. Das
Films scored by Satyam (composer)
Telugu remakes of Kannada films